Nebo School District is a public school district that serves the southern part of Utah County.

Description

The district covers more than 1,300 square miles. It is named for nearby Mount Nebo, the tallest peak in the Wasatch Range. The district borders the Alpine, Provo City, Wasatch County, North Sanpete, Juab, and Tintic School Districts.

With over 42,000 students, Nebo is the 7th largest school district in Utah. The district operates thirty-one elementary schools (grades K–5), five middle schools (grades 6–7), five junior high schools (grades 8–9), and six high schools (grades 10–12). It also operates various alternative-education programs.

High schools

Maple Mountain High

Payson High
Established in 1912, the current building was finished in 1967, with a new building announced for 2023. The student body comes from Payson, as well as from a number of nearby communities such as Santaquin, Goshen, Genola, and Elberta.  The principal is Jesse Sorenson.  Its mascot is the Lions, named in thanks for support from the local Lions Club.  Payson High is notable for its use in the popular 1984 film Footloose.

Spanish Fork High
Built in 1962, Spanish Fork High was the first high school in the Nebo School District. It covers the city of Spanish Fork and outlying communities. The school principal is Matt Christensen. The school mascot is the Mighty Dons, and its colors are red and gray.

Springville High

Salem Hills High
Opened on August 20, 2008, Salem Hills was the first new high school constructed by the Nebo School District since the 1970s. Students come from Payson, Salem, Elk Ridge, and Woodland Hills. The school principal is Ryan McGuire. Its mascot is a Skyhawk, with school colors light blue, navy blue, and gold. In December 2008, Salem Hills was awarded the "2008 Best K-12 Education Project Design" by the Intermountain Contractors for the State of Utah.
In 2021 the school was awarded the National Performing Arts School of Excellence award, making them the 1st high school in Utah to receive this award.

Junior high schools
Mapleton Junior High
Jo Lynn Ford, Principal 

Payson Junior High
Kevin Mecham, Principal 

Spanish Fork Junior High
Chris Loveless, Principal 

Springville Junior High
Tiffanie Miley, Principal 

Salem Junior High
Keith Richards, Principal

Middle schools

 Spring Canyon Middle School (Springville)
Alison Hansen, Principal 
 Maple Grove Middle School (Mapleton)
Nate Whitney, Principal 
 Mt. Nebo Middle School (Payson)
Rhet Rowley, Principal 
 Valley View Middle School (Salem)
David Knudsen, Principal 
 Diamond Fork Middle School (Spanish Fork)
Dr. Brenda Burr, Principal

Elementary schools

 Apple Valley (Santaquin)
 Art City (Springville)
 Barnett (Payson)
 Brockbank (Spanish Fork)
 Brookside (Springville)
 Canyon (Spanish Fork)
 Cherry Creek (Springville)
 East Meadows (Spanish Fork)
 Foothills (Salem)
 Goshen (Goshen)
 Hobble Creek (Mapleton)
 Larsen (Spanish Fork)
 Maple Ridge (Mapleton)
 Mapleton (Mapleton)
 Meadow Brook (Springville)
 Mount Loafer (Salem)
 Orchard Hills (Santaquin)
 Park (Spanish Fork)
 Parkview (Payson)
 Rees (Spanish Fork)
 Riverview (Spanish Fork)
 Salem (Salem)
 Sage Creek (Springville)
 Santaquin (Santaquin)
 Sierra Bonita (Spanish Fork)
 Spanish Oaks (Spanish Fork)
 Spring Lake (Payson)
 Taylor (Payson)
 Westside (Springville)
 Wilson (Payson)

References

External links

 Nebo School District
 Mapleton Mountain High School
 Spanish Fork High School
 Salem Hills
 Springville High School
 Payson High School
 Payson Junior High School
 Salem Junior High School

School districts in Utah
Education in Utah County, Utah
Spanish Fork, Utah